|}

The Nijinsky Stakes is a Listed flat horse race in Ireland open to horses aged three years only.
It is run at Leopardstown over a distance of 1 mile and 4 furlongs (2,413 metres), and it is scheduled to take place each year in June.

The race was first run in 2008, and was known as the King George V Cup between 2013 and 2019.

Winners

See also
 Horse racing in Ireland
 List of Irish flat horse races

References
Racing Post:

Flat races in Ireland
Flat horse races for three-year-olds
Leopardstown Racecourse
Recurring sporting events established in 2008
2008 establishments in Ireland